SIOS Technology Corp. is a San Mateo, Californiabased company focused on IT operations analytics ITOA, cloud computing, business continuity and disaster recovery for large enterprises. Since 1996, the company has been providing high availability clustering software.SIOS Technology Inc., based in Tokyo, Japan, created SIOS Technology Corp. when it expanded its business of assisting large enterprises in adopting open, cloud computing technology. SIOS Technology Inc. acquired SteelEye Technology in 2006.

History

SIOS Technology Inc. was founded in May 1997 in Japan and has led the development of open source software and Web application software. Given its open source software experience, the company pushed for the early adoption of Linux products in Japan. SIOS Technology Inc. provides SAN and SANLess software products that protect applications from downtime and data loss in any combination of physical, virtual, and cloud. In addition to its SteelEye Technology acquisition in 2006, SIOS Technology Inc. in 2008 acquired Gluegent, a web application development company.

SteelEye Technology was founded in December 1999 by Jim Fitzgerald, Sue Ellery and Jim Mason. The company acquired the LifeKeeper high-availability clustering software from NCR Corporation that year, and began targeting the fledgling Linux server community with the product in January 2000.

AT&T’s Bell Labs created the LifeKeeper platform in the mid 1990s for high-availability of AT&T's Star Unix servers that operated the telecom company’s phone switching technology. NCR took control of the LifeKeeper portfolio when AT&T spun off the company in 1997.

The business focuses on software products that provide high availability and disaster protection for business critical applications.

In 2003, the company introduced LifeKeeper for Windows 2003. In 2008, the company announced DataKeeper data replication. The company expanded its presence into virtual environments with the introduction of business continuity for VMware in 2007 and Citrix and Microsoft’s Hyper-V in 2008.
In 2015, SIOS introduced a machine-learning based IT operations analytics platform for VMware environments.

SIOS iQ was recognized at the 2017 VMworld  trade show. SIOS iQ was also named a silver winner in Most Innovative Product, Enterprise Categoryin Best in Biz Awards, 2016, the only independent business awards program judged by members of the press and industry analysts.

In December 5, 2017, SIOS partnered with VSTECS Holdings Ltd. a technology product and supply chain services platform in the Asia-Pacific (APAC) region. The partnership enables VSTECs to provide comprehensive professional services and SANless high availability clustering software to AWS customers throughout APAC.

See also
Virtual machine
Business continuity
Disaster recovery
IT operations analytics

References

External links
 Clustering For Mere Mortals Blog
 Google Finance on SIOS
 US SIOS Website
 SIOS APAC multi-language portal
 Linux Clustering Blogs

Software companies based in California
Software companies established in 1997
Software companies of the United States